Sunset Rubdown is a Canadian art rock music group from Montreal. The band began as a solo project for Spencer Krug of Wolf Parade, who released his debut, Snake's Got a Leg, in early 2005. By the next year the project expanded to become a full band which included Camilla Wynne Ingr (former Pony Up!), Jordan Robson-Cramer (Magic Weapon), and Michael Doerksen.

Musical style
Sunset Rubdown is built around lyricist Spencer Krug's vocals and eccentric musical compositions. Krug's lyrics are characterized by surreal and mythological imagery, and often tell epic stories (most notably on their LP Dragonslayer). Musically, the band's sound is highlighted by distinct drum, keyboard, and guitar signatures.

Album releases
Krug released the solo-created Sunset Rubdown EP in January 2006. This was followed by the first full band album Shut Up I Am Dreaming recorded in Montreal in early 2006 and released in May to positive reviews, finishing the year with a 15th-place ranking on Pitchfork's best albums list. 

Random Spirit Lover, recorded in Montreal's Breakglass studios in the late winter of 2007, was released on the band's new label, Jagjaguwar, in October of that year. The recording featured an eclectic, and elaborate collection of songs, which was heralded as one of 2007's best albums by several critics and music publications. The CD made a number of top-20 albums of the year lists, earned Pitchfork's "Best New Music" distinction and finished in 14th spot in Pitchfork's year-end Readers Poll. The album also made NPR's list of top albums of 2007, and was nominated for the U.S. Indie Music industry's Plug Award in the Best Indie Album of the Year category.

In 2007, Mark Nicol was added as the band's fifth member. Sunset Rubdown completed their first tour of UK and Europe in June 2008.

The band recorded their fourth album in Chicago after a fall 2008 tour of the U.S.. Following a spring 2009 tour of several European countries, Dragonslayer was released on June 23, 2009 to critical acclaim. The album's 'live off the studio floor' dynamics has garnered widespread acclaim. The band once again earned Pitchfork's "Best New Music" ranking, and received a perfect '10' from England's Drowned in Sound web magazine, with Dragonslayer staying in the top-10 on Canadian and U.S. college and indie music charts (Earshot, Chart Attack) for 10 straight weeks through July and August 2009.

Dragonslayer finished on many online music magazine and music blogs top albums year-end lists (Drowned in Sound, Associated Press, Earshot), including several Top 10 lists (Chart Attack, Cokemachineglow). The album was voted as the 16th best album of the year in Pitchfork's year-end readers poll and also finished as one of the top-40 highest ranked/reviewed albums of the year based on Metacritic's tracking system.

The band completed a 46-city tour of Europe, U.S and Japan from September to November 2009, after which they disbanded.

In December 2022 the band announced a reunion tour slated for the spring of 2023.

Discography
 Snake's Got a Leg LP (2005) Global Symphonic
 Sunset Rubdown EP (2006) Global Symphonic
 Shut Up I Am Dreaming LP (2006) Absolutely Kosher
 Random Spirit Lover LP (2007) Jagjaguwar
 Sunset Rubdown Introducing Moonface EP (2009) Aagoo Records
 Dragonslayer LP (2009) Jagjaguwar

Personnel
While all members of Sunset Rubdown resided in Montreal, Quebec, all are transplants from other parts of Canada. Spencer Krug, Michael Doerksen and Jordan Robson-Cramer are originally from British Columbia, with Camilla Wynne Ingr originally from Alberta and Mark Nicol from Ontario.

 Spencer Krug - vocals, keys, guitar, kick drum
 Camilla Wynne Ingr - vocals, percussion, keyboards, "Jane-of-all-trades"
 Michael Doerksen - guitar, bass, synthesizers, drums, vocals
 Jordan Robson-Cramer - drums, guitar, keyboards
 Mark Nicol - bass, kalimba, drums

References

External links

Media

 Sunset Rubdown Daytrotter Session Free MP3 Download
 Daytrotter Encore Session (Free Songs)
Interview with Sunset Rubdown on czech Radio Wave (30 mins english audio with czech translation)
Sunset Rubdown on NPR Music
Sunset Rubdown: Interview, Part One  Spencer Krug interviewed by Drowned in Sound, September 2009
Sunset Rubdown: Exclusive Interview, Part Two  Spencer and the band interviewed by Drowned in Sound, September 2009

Other
 Artist page at Jagjaguwar Records

Musical groups established in 2005
Musical groups from Montreal
Canadian indie rock groups
English-language musical groups from Quebec
Jagjaguwar artists
Musical groups disestablished in 2009
2005 establishments in Quebec
2009 disestablishments in Quebec
Autoharp players